A poison message refers to a client–server model issue, where a client machine tries to send a message to the server and fails too many times (the actual amount of "too many" is variable).

The behavior toward Poison messages varies - they are either discarded, create a service request event, or initiate other failure indications. The term is used mainly in Microsoft-related frameworks, like SQL Server or Windows Communication Foundation (WCF).
RabbitMQ also has a notion of poisoned messages.

See also 
 Microsoft Message Queuing

References 

Message Queuing
Message-oriented middleware
Computing terminology